The 80th National Guard Higher Command (80ή ΑΔΤΕ) is a Hellenic Army mechanized infantry brigade based at Kos, in the Dodecanese Islands.

Structure 
  80th National Guard Higher Command (80ή ΑΔΤΕ), based at Kos
 HQ Company (ΛΣΤ/80 ΑΔΤΕ)
 80th National Guard Armored Battalion (80 ΕΑΡΜΕΘ)
 80th National Guard Armored Reconnaissance Battalion (80 ΕΑΝΕΘ)
 282nd National Guard Battalion (282 M/ΚΤΕ) Mechanized
 543rd National Guard Battalion (543 Μ/ΚΤΕ) Mechanized
 295th National Guard Battalion (295 ΤΕ)
 588th National Guard Battalion (588 TE)
 80th National Guard Artillery Battalion (80 ΜΕΘ)
 80th National Guard Anti Aircraft Artillery Battalion (80 ΜΕΑΠ)
 80th National Guard Medical Battalion (80 ΤΥΕΘ)
 80th Anti Tank Company (80 ΛΑΤ)
 80th National Guard Anti Tank Company (80 ΛΑΤΕΘ)
 80th Engineer Company (80 ΛΜΧ)
 80th National Guard Signal Company (80 ΛΔΒΕΘ)
 80th National Guard Support Battalion (80 ΤΥΠΕΘ)

Mechanized infantry brigades of Greece
Kos